The Ganapati Atharvasirsha is a Sanskrit text and a minor Upanishad of Hinduism. It is a late Upanishadic text dedicated to Ganesha, the deity representing intellect and learning. It asserts that Ganesha is same as the eternal underlying reality, Brahman. The text is attached to the Atharvaveda, and is also referred to as the Sri Ganapati Atharva Sirsha, the Ganapati Atharvashirsha, the Ganapati Atharvasirsa, or the Ganapati Upanishad.

The text exists in several variants, but with the same message. Ganesha is described to be same as other Hindu gods, as ultimate truth and reality (Brahman), as satcitananda, as the soul in oneself (Atman) and in every living being, as Om.

History
Ghurye notes that the text identifies Ganesa with the Brahman and is of a very late origin, while Courtright and Thapan date it to the 16th or 17th century. While the Upanishad is a late text, the earliest mention of the word Ganapati is found in hymn 2.23.1 of the 2nd-millennium BCE Rigveda. Ganapati literally means "leader of the multitudes", according to John Grimes, it is however uncertain that the Vedic term referred specifically to Ganesha.

The Ganapati Upanishad text is listed at number 89 in the Muktikā canon of 108 Upanishads compiled in the mid 17th century, and also mentioned c. 1800 by Upanishad Brahmayogin in his commentary on the Muktika canon.

Textual variants
The text exists in several versions. A critical edition was published in 1984 by Gudrun Bühnemann with a translation.

A heavily edited and abbreviated translation was made in the early nineteenth century by Vans Kennedy.

J. R. Sartha published a 1969 edition.  In 1985 Courtright published an English translation based on the Sartha edition.

Swami Chinmayananda published a variant of the Sanskrit text with an English translation in 1987.  In his version of the source text he groups verses together to form sections that he calls upamantras. He notes that as a result of this his line numbering and versification may differ from those given in other variants.

John Grimes provides a structural analysis including a version of the Sanskrit text and an English translation in his 1995 book on Ganapati.  His version provides no line numbers.

It is part of the five Atharva Shirsha Upanishads, each of which are named after the five main deities or shrines (panchayatanan of the Smarta tradition) of Ganapati, Narayana, Rudra, Surya and Devi.

Contents 
The text opens with the Shanti hymn prelude, or the peace chant, found in many manuscripts of Sanskrit texts.

Ganesha as the supreme reality 
The first verse of the Upanishad proper asserts that Ganesha is the Supreme principle and all pervading metaphysical absolute reality called Brahman in Hinduism. Ganesha is asserted by the text as identical to Om, the Brahman, the Atman or soul, and as the visible manifestation of the Vedic idea Tat tvam asi (you are that) found in the sixth chapter of the Chandogya Upanishad, in a manner similar to Shiva in Shaiva Upanishads, Vishnu in Vaishnava Upanishads, Devi in Shakti Upanishads.

Homage to Lord . . You are indeed the visible "That Thou Art" [tattvamasi]. You indeed produce the universe. You indeed sustain it. You indeed destroy it. You indeed are the all pervading reality. You are the manifestation of the eternal self (Brahman).

Chinmayananda translates this verse as follows:

(O Lord Ganapati!) You alone are the visible manifestation of the Essence of the words "That thou art". You alone are the Doer. You alone are the Creator and the Sustainer (of the universe). You alone are the Destroyer. Verily You alone are all this - "idam sarvam" - in the creation, because You are Brahman. You are the Eternal Atman in bodily form."

Identification with other deities and with Om 
Ganesha is same as Brahma, Vishnu, Shiva, all deities, the universe and the Om. Ganesha, asserts the text, is the Absolute, as well the same soul is each of every living being.

You are Brahmā, Vişņu, and Rudra [Śiva]. You are Agni, Vāyu, and Sūrya. You are Chandrama. You are earth, space, and heaven. You are the manifestation of the mantra "".

A variant version of this passage is translated by Chinmayananda as follows:

(O Lord Ganapati!) You are (the Trinity) Brahma, Viṣnu, and Maheśa. You are Indra. You are fire and air. You are the sun and the moon. You are Brahman. You are (the three worlds) Bhuloka, Antariksha-loka, and Swargaloka. You are Om. (that is to say, You are all this).

The verses state Ganesha to be all that is spiritual, the satcitananda, all words, all four levels of speech, all knowledge, all consciousness, the source of all universe, the universe now, that in which the universe will someday be dissolved, the three Guṇas of Samkhya philosophy and what is beyond, all states of being, the truth, the oneness, the contentment, the inner bliss.

Integration of Tantra 

Some evidence that the work is of late origin which associate Ganapati with the Muladhara chakra:

You continually dwell in the .Chinmayananda (1987) p. 127.  In Chinmayananda's numbering system this is part of upamantra 7.

This text provides a detailed description of Ganesha's bija mantra . When this mantra is written using simplified transliteration methods that do not include diacritical marks to represent nasal sounds, it is written as "gam". This bija mantra is also used in the Ganesha Purana which is generally dated as preceding the Ganapati Atharvasirsa.  Courtright translates the passage as follows:

Having uttered the first letter of the word , ga, then I utter the nasal sound   which follows and appears beautifully like the crescent moon. This is your form. The ga forms the initial letter, the a forms the middle letter and the   forms the final letter. To utter this sound [i.e., ] is to utter all sounds together.Chinmayananda (1987) p. 127.  In Chinmayananda's numbering system this is part of upamantra 9; Quote: One should first utter the first syllable "ग" in the word "गण" followed by "अ" the first of the alphabets. Add an अनुस्वार (a nasal म् indicated by a dot above the line). Then adorn it by a crescent (also a nasal). Prefix ॐ to it. And this represents (O Lord Ganapati!) your terrestrial form endowed with gunas.

Gayatri mantra
The text includes a Gayatri mantra in verse 8, with Ganesha as the source of inspiration for meditation and knowledge, in Nrichad Gayatri poetic meter. This, states John Grimes, distills the highest human spiritual aspiration. The tooth and trunk in the Ganesha-Gayatri mantra, adds Grimes, embodies symbolism for philosophical and spiritual truths, channeling the attention to physical, intellectual and intuitional self-realization.

Colophon
The text asserts its own status as an upanishad in its final line, which reads "Thus, the "). The text associates itself with the Atharvaveda, in a passage that Chinmayananda translates as "Thus says Atharvana" (Sanskrit:).

The text ends with the Shanti hymn, states Grimes, "May we be protected together, may we be sustained together, may we do great deeds together, Om, peace, peace, peace!".

Reception
It is the most important surviving Sanskrit text in the Ganapatyas tradition of Hinduism, wherein Ganesha is revered. The entire text is written over the entrance to the temple hall in the  Ganesha shrine at Ranjangaon.

See also
Atharvashiras Upanishad
Devi Upanishad
Mahanarayana Upanishad
Nirvana Upanishad

References

Further reading 

Swami Chinmayananda. Glory of Ganesha. (Central Chinmaya Mission Trust: Bombay, 1987). pp. 121–131. Other reprint editions: 1991, 1995.
Courtright, Paul B. : Lord of Obstacles, Lord of Beginnings. Appendix: "The ". (Oxford University Press: New York, 1985)

External links
An English Translation Of the Ganapati Upanishad

Ganesha
Upanishads